{{Infobox character
| name = Amelia Shepherd
| series = Private Practice & Grey's Anatomy
| image = Amelia s11.jpg
| image_size = 230px
| caption = Caterina Scorsone as Dr. Amelia Shepherd
| first = Private Practice:"Eyes Wide Open" (3.19) April 1, 2010  (as recurring cast)   "Take Two" (4.01)  September 23, 2010  (as series regular)  Grey's Anatomy: "Superfreak" (7.03)  October 7, 2010  (as guest star)  "I Must Have Lost it on the Wind (11.01)  September 25, 2014  (as series regular)Station 19: "Born to Run" (03.08) March 12, 2020  (as guest star)
| last =  Still in show
| creator = Shonda Rhimes
| portrayer = Caterina Scorsone
| full_name = Amelia Frances Shepherd
| nickname = Amy Hurricane AmeliaShepherdessThe Other Dr. Shepherd Lady ShepherdEmilio ShepherdBlack SheepThe Other Shepherd Girl Shepherd  The Junkie  The Wrong Dr. Shepherd  Auntie Amelia  Mommy
| occupation = Head of Neurosurgery at Grey Sloan Memorial Hospital Neurosurgeon at Oceanside wellness group (former)  Neurosurgeon at St. Ambrose Hospital (former)
| title = Chief of NeurosurgeryM.D. F.A.C.S.
| significant_other = Ryan Kerrigan (fiancé, deceased)James Peterson (ex-fiancé)Atticus Lincoln (ex-boyfriend)Kai Bartley (partner)
| family = Carolyn Shepherd (née Maloney; mother) Christopher Shepherd (father, deceased)  Derek Shepherd (brother, deceased) Adam (uncle, deceased) Nancy Shepherd (sister)Kathleen Shepherd (sister) Liz Shepherd (sister) Henry Montgomery (godson from Addison)  Addison Montgomery (former sister-in-law declared sister) Meredith Grey (sister-in-law, declared sister)  Maggie Pierce (declared sister)   Zola Grey Shepherd (niece) Derek Bailey Shepherd  (nephew)  Ellis Shepherd (niece)  Lucas Adams (nephew)  John (brother-in-law via Nancy) Nine nieces and four nephews (via her sisters)
| children = Christopher Shepherd (deceased, with Ryan Kerrigan)  Scout Derek Shepherd Lincoln (with Atticus Lincoln)
| nationality = American
| spouse = 
}}Amelia Frances Shepherd''', M.D., F.A.C.S. is a fictional character on the ABC American television Grey's Anatomy medical drama and the spin-off series Private Practice, portrayed by Caterina Scorsone. In her debut appearance in season three, Amelia visited her former sister-in-law, Addison Montgomery, and became a partner at the Oceanside Wellness Group. In July 2010, it was reported that she was promoted to series regular for the fourth season, after appearing in the final five episodes of season three. She remained in the series until the final episode. 

Scorsone crossed over as a special guest in one episode each of the seventh (2010–11) and eighth seasons (2011–12) of Grey's Anatomy, which ran concurrently with the fourth (2010–11) and fifth seasons (2011–12) of Private Practice, in both 2010 and 2012. After Private Practice ended its six-season run in January 2013, Scorsone returned to the Grey's Anatomy universe in its parent show, recurring in the final four episodes of the tenth season in 2014. She was then promoted to series regular for season eleven (2014–15), and has appeared as a main cast member for all of its subsequent seven seasons.

Amelia is the youngest sibling of Derek Shepherd (Patrick Dempsey)'s family, and a recovering drug addict. Her storylines in both shows revolve around her struggle with sobriety, recklessness, and ambition as a neurosurgeon. Scorsone has been a part of the Grey's universe for over ten years and has appeared in a total of eleven seasons as a series regular. She has also appeared as a guest star in the second spin-off, Station 19. The actress has been lauded by critics and fans alike.

Scorsone describes her character's “hero” journey as showing the “full Phoenix-ing of a woman who was so broken and traumatized by loss and addiction”.

Development
Casting and creation
On March 2, 2010, Scorsone was recruited to join the cast of Shonda Rhimes' drama series Private Practice in the  recurring role of Amelia Shepherd, the sister of Derek Shepherd from its parent show, Grey's Anatomy. Eric Stoltz, who was directing Scorsone's debut episode "Eyes Wide Open" heard about the role of Amelia and recommended Scorsone portray her, as he knew her from working with her during her child actress days on My Horrible Year! a decade prior. Shonda Rhimes agreed to bring her in after Stoltz noted her acting chops and resemblance to Patrick Dempsey, who plays Derek Shepherd. Scorsone mentioned that she still had to do the regular auditioning process to get cast. She ended up appearing in five episodes of the third season of Private Practice. As of July 2010, Scorsone was promoted to series regular for Private Practice.

On top of her sister being a big fan of the parent show, she later revealed she considered becoming a doctor after binge-watching the first season of Grey's when she was finishing her bachelor's degree saying, "I would unwind after exams by binge-watching the first season of Grey's Anatomy. When I got to the end of it, I was under the misapprehension that I wanted to become a doctor. So I went to this medical faculty lecture series and by the end, I said, ‘I don't want to be a doctor. In fact, I just want to be on Grey's Anatomy.’"

Characterization and development

In an interview with The Hollywood Reporter, Scorsone spoke about Amelia's past as an addict being exposed in the season eleven episode, "Could We Start Again, Please?" She elaborated further, "There's the shock and sadness of seeing that all of the work that she's done to build this new life in Seattle is being destroyed, as everybody is finding out about her past in a way that she's not in control of," she continues. "It's not as though she decided that she's comfortable with revealing her history and was able to tell the story sensitively; it was taken from her and exposed in a way that she wasn't in control of and that she wouldn't have chosen. It's a pretty exposing and disempowering experience for her."

Scorsone describes Amelia as being “really intense” and requiring “lots of emotional energy to play”. She said, “To kind of shake it out and get back to my real personality, it helps to kind of go away and explore new things and see the world a little bit”. Regarding her fifth season storyline on Private Practice, Scorsone commented on her troubled character in 2011, "Yes, at this point she suffers emotionally and chemically. She had her surgical privileges revoked because she fell off the wagon. So I explore depression, grief and substance abuse. I think – speaking of wanting to help people – I do get to articulate and illustrate for people what a struggle with substance abuse and mental health looks like." 
 "Gosh. Everything we did in season 5 of Private Practice felt so intense and fresh. I do think we really dug into the addiction story in a way that educated so many people and made it clear that addiction is an illness and not a moral failing. The whole journey Amelia got to play that year was so rich and deep."

The loss of her newborn son in Private Practice transmits into her storyline on Grey's. In the thirteenth season (2016–17), Amelia experiences a rift with her newly wedded spouse Owen Hunt, portrayed by Kevin McKidd. Caterina Scorsone offered to rationalize Shepherd's fears of having another child, causing the rift, despite Owen being somewhat aware of the loss of her firstborn son. She said, “...he's been very accepting but this is a very core trauma for Amelia and there's something about trauma that goes beyond logic. When someone has undergone serious trauma, regardless of whether you think objectively — "Yes, this person is going to be very patient and accepting of it" — but there's something like trauma itself that makes whatever it was that traumatized the person almost unsayable. I think that's what she's experiencing: even to speak it is to re-traumatize herself in some ways. I think this is a powerful combination of perfect storm factors in her paralysis. She doesn't want to disappoint him, she loves him so much and she is also totally paralyzed by the fear and trauma she went through in Los Angeles."

Despite Owen and Amelia breaking up over having children, the two share a bond by co-parenting Betty and her son, Leo, who Owen later adopts. In the sixteenth season (2019–20), Amelia discovers she is pregnant again. Scorsone felt Shepherd was more prepared now that she had experienced parenting Leo and fellow addict Betty in the previous two seasons, as well as her articulating the loss of her son Christopher aloud. The sixteenth season sees Amelia in a healthier, happier place. Scorsone felt that the character had come into her “authentic self”, with her career, community, and support of sisters Meredith and Maggie Pierce portrayed by Kelly McCreary. She said, ”She doesn't want or need to lose herself in anything or anyone anymore“ and that her motherhood isn't depending on the relationship with her new boyfriend Link, portrayed by Chris Carmack, lasting”. Scorsone also mentioned her uncertainty of Amelia's true love for Link, possibly due to pregnancy hormones, but said Amelia admired his commitment to having the child regardless.

Private Practice storyline
As explained by Amelia in "In the Name of Love", she and her brother Derek watched her father get shot dead at his store when she was merely five years old.

Amelia comes to the show as part of a team of neurosurgeons visiting Los Angeles to do a consult in the season three episode “Eyes Wide Open”. She joined the team despite knowing she would encounter her former sister-in-law, Addison Montgomery. However, Amelia is soon fired from the team after offering the patient's family hope in the form of experimental surgery, but the patient's husband requests Amelia to perform it despite the risks. Her boss, Dr. Geraldine Ginsberg, does not believe that the surgery will work and neither does Derek Shepherd, Amelia's older brother.

Amelia later asks Naomi Bennett for a place at Oceanside as the primary neurosurgeon. In the season three finale, Amelia performs surgery on Maya, Sam, and Naomi's pregnant daughter. As soon as Amelia finishes surgery on Maya, she rushes to perform surgery to repair brain bleeds in Dell, another employee of the hospital. However, Dell dies on the table, and Amelia takes it very hard. A friend from college comes to visit, whose mother died from Huntington's disease. Amelia pushes her friend to find out if she also has the gene. When her friend's results come back positive for Huntington's gene, she asks Amelia to help her kill herself in assisted suicide, because she did not want to die the way her mother did. Amelia refuses which leads to her old friend taking matters into her own hands and completing suicide. Amelia then ends up relapsing on drugs along with a man named Ryan whom she had met one night while grieving. They fall in love with each other and Ryan proposes to her, she accepts and in return gifts Ryan her father's watch, which has much significance because her father lost his life while being robbed because he refused to give up the watch (it was present from Amelia's mother to him and signified their love). Addison then stages an intervention with her coworkers for Amelia. Amelia and Ryan start discussing their future, and children which lead to them deciding to stop doing drugs but not without one last final high.  Unfortunately, Ryan overdoses and dies. Amelia wakes up next to her dead fiancé and later learns she is pregnant with his child. However, the baby, who Amelia names Christopher, is born without a frontal lobe, causing him to die in Amelia's arms soon after his birth. Amelia donates all of Christopher's organs to ensure his death was not in vain.

Grey's Anatomy storyline
Guest appearances
She appeared in the third episode of the seventh season of Grey's Anatomy where Amelia and Derek started to reconcile their differences, as part of a cross-over. She reprised her role in the fifteenth episode of the eighth season, working a neuro case with Lexie Grey, portrayed by Chyler Leigh. In this episode, Amelia disputes with Derek yet again on surgery, this time about Cooper's son's mom, who has a brain tumour.

Following the end of Private Practice in January 2013, the character of Amelia was added to its progenitor show Grey's Anatomy. In season ten, she was seen in the season's last four episodes visiting her brother Derek and his wife Meredith Grey in their Seattle home and helping care for their children. Previously, she had only made one-off guest appearances on the show when storylines crossed over between the two series.

 As regular cast member 
On June 23, 2014,  Scorsone and her character were permanently added to the regular cast for season eleven, which began airing in September 2014.

In the eleventh season, Amelia has ended her engagement with James and develops a secret fling with Owen Hunt (Kevin McKidd), which she later confides in Derek about. However, after Derek's death, Owen goes to the army. He later returns, and she grieves her brother's loss with him. The twelfth season sees Amelia and Owen's romance developing further, as Amelia expresses repressed anger over Meredith unplugging Derek before she could say goodbye. She is also angry over Miranda Bailey (Chandra Wilson) hiring Penny Blake (Samantha Sloyan), one of Derek's doctors on the day he died. Later, she marries Owen but expresses doubt and second thoughts before the wedding in the season 12 finale. The thirteenth season sees Amelia and Owen's marriage face problems when the idea of pregnancy brings repressed memories of the death of her firstborn son, Christopher. They divorce early in the fourteenth season civilly, after Amelia's brain tumor is removed, explaining some of her erratic behavior late in the thirteenth season. Late in the fourteenth season sees Amelia helps a teenage addict named Betty and her six-month son, Leo. Owen eventually adopts Leo, and Betty returns home to her parents for stability. Despite Owen and Amelia rekindling romantic feelings, Owen discovers former flame Teddy Altman (Kim Raver) is pregnant with his baby. Amelia starts sleeping with Link and later discovers she is pregnant with his child. She expresses uncertainty about revealing the paternity of the baby, as it might have been Owen's, but Link's affirmation of loving the child regardless of whether he is the father soothes her. She gives birth to their son in the sixteenth-season finale, who was later named Scout Derek Shepherd Lincoln in the season premiere of season 17. At the end of Season 17, Link proposes to Amelia, but she turns him down. In season 18, Amelia was part of a storyline with Meredith which saw them travel to Minnesota to take part in Parkinson’s Disease research with the hope of curing the disease. Whilst in Minnesota, Amelia met a fellow Hopkins Alumni, Neuroscientist Dr. Kai Bartley who identifies as non-binary. During the Season 18 mid-season finale, Kai traveled to Seattle with Dr. David Hamilton the Doctor who has Parkinson’s Disease and the person who is funding the research into curing the disease. Amelia guide meditates Kai outside Grey Sloan Memorial Hospital as David is having surgery and the pair finally share a kiss.

Reception
Tanner Transky for Entertainment Weekly felt Scorsone's appearance in the Grey's season eight cross-over episode, “Have You Seen Me Lately?” was one of the weaker cross-over episodes for its parent show, but praised the “dramatic” nature in its Private Practice'' section, evaluating that “For characters, I don't really care about that much, I did care... a little bit”. She also said Amelia “proved her strength”, despite the “demons in her life”.

References

Further reading
Grey's Anatomy: Amelia's Private Practice Past Is (Finally) Resurfacing

Television characters introduced in 2010
Private Practice (TV series) characters
Grey's Anatomy characters
Fictional characters from New York City
Fictional characters from New York (state)
Fictional Harvard University people
Fictional drug addicts
Fictional bisexual females
Fictional neurosurgeons
Crossover characters in television
Fictional female doctors
American female characters in television
Fictional opioid users